Simon Hinds (14 July 1887 – 7 December 1943) was a Guyanese cricketer. He played in nine first-class matches for British Guiana from 1909 to 1913.

See also
 List of Guyanese representative cricketers

References

External links
 

1887 births
1943 deaths
Guyanese cricketers
Guyana cricketers